Sterculioideae is a subfamily of the family Malvaceae containing evergreen and deciduous trees and shrubs.

A 2006 molecular study indicated the Sterculioideae was most likely to be a monophyletic group, and that it had four major clades within it. However, the relationships between the clades were not resolved.

The clades consist of a:
 Cola clade, with the genera Cola and Octolobus of Africa and Pterygota of Africa, South America and southeast Asia forming a subclade, Hildegardia and Firmiana forming a second and Scaphium and Pterocymbium a third.
 Heritiera clade comprising the genus Heritiera
 Sterculia clade comprising the large genus Sterculia of Africa and Asia.
 Brachychiton clade of Australasian and New Caledonian species, including Brachychiton, Acropogon, Argyrodendron and Franciscodendron.

References

 
Rosid subfamilies